Toxbot is a computer worm that was primarily active in 2005. On infected computers, it opened up a backdoor to allow command and control over the IRC network, thus creating a botnet that at its peak comprised about 1.5 million computers. The two makers of the botnet were arrested in October 2005 and received jail sentences of 24 and 18 months from a Dutch court.

References

External links 
 W32.Toxbot at Symantec Security Response
 Win32/Toxbot at CA
 Toxbot at F-Secure

Computer worms